Fill Your Heart may refer to:

Fill Your Heart With Biff Rose, album by Biff Rose
"Fill Your Heart", song by Biff Rose and Paul Williams, covered by Tiny Tim, David Bowie on Hunky Dory and by Claudio Casanova & His Orchestra